Joan Çetiri, Grabovari also as Jovan Četirević Grabovan (c. 1720–1781), was a Serbian icon painter from Albania active during the 18th century; he is regarded one of the masters of Orthodox iconostasis painting. Among others, he painted the Lepavina and Orahovica monasteries, and together with his brother Gjergj, many churches in Serbia and in Albania, like The Dormition of the Theotokos’ Church in Berat, Saint Nicholas’ Church in Vanaj, Fier, and Saint Athanasius’ Church in Karavasta (Myzeqe).

Life
Çetiri was born in Grabovë (Elbasan), in Central Albania. His family was of Greek-Aromanian descent which links him to the ateliers of northern Greece and Epirus. Most of his career was spent up north in the Hapsburg Empire where his reputation rests as a Serbian painter of Greek-Aromanian origin. 

His professional career began in the Habsburg territories, such as Osijek (today in Croatia), and what is today Vojvodina, in the service of Orthodox Serbs (the Metropolitanate of Karlovci). Although his painting style was from the southern Balkans, he was influenced by the Western art style, in order to fulfill the wider tastes of his employers. His works are to be found in Serbian Orthodox churches scattered across Croatia (Slavonia), Hungary and Vojvodina.

From the church registers, we know that Joan Çetiri lived in Osijek with his mother, brother, sister and six children. It was here that Çetiri got acquainted with the baroque painting that would transform his work. He remained living in this town until his death and he signed most of his icons as the “inhabitant of Osijek” (stanovnik osečki).

Work 

Grabovari is considered to be one of the best icon painters of the period. He modeled notions of late medieval, so called “zoographic” painting which he brought from his native land and absorbed the much sought new, baroque style. He developed an original style, somewhat more traditional in comparison with other Serbian icon painters of the period. On the other hand, Grabovari was an inquiring mind and he adopted many baroque features developing a bolder, more independent style, with exquisite baroque modeling of figures which are now much less static, naturalistic portraits and absence of golden background. In some of his works (Szekesfehervar iconostasis), with his light palette Grabovari even comes close to Rococo style.

Grabovari painted a number of iconostasises, all of them in Serb churches and monasteries. This is a list of some of his works:
Molovin church in Srem (1772)
Orahovica church in Slavonia (1775)
 monastery of Lepavina in Croatia (1775) 
 Székesfehérvár church in Hungary (together with Grigorije Popović, 1776)
 Slatina church (1785) 
 Pavlovac church in Croatia

His last work dates from 1780.

It seems that he was also working as a wood carver.

See also
 Teodor Ilić Češljar
 Stefan Tenecki
 Dimitrije Bačević
 Georgije Bakalović
 Jovan Pačić
 Stefan Gavrilović
 Teodor Kračun
 Janko Halkozović
 Jakov Orfelin
 Petar Nikolajević Moler
 Konstantin Danil

References 

Dinko Davidov, Spomenici Budimske eparhije, Beograd – Novi Sad 1990, pp. 60–61, 418
Dejan Medaković, Barok kod Srba, Zagreb 1988, pp. 143–144
Kučeković A. 2004. Ikonostas Jovana Četirevića Grabovana u Orahovici. Zbornik radova Narodnog muzeja - Istorija umetnosti 17, (2): 219-242 (excerpt in English: *http://scindeks.ceon.rs/article.aspx?query=ISSID%26and%263700&page=9&sort=8&backurl=%2Fissue.aspx%3Fissue%3D3700)
Dr Dušan J. Popović, Srbi u Vojvodini 2, Novi Sad 1990, pp. 421–422

1720 births
1790 deaths
Serbian people of Aromanian descent
Albanian painters